Friedrich Wilhelm Waldemar Fromm (8 October 1888 – 12 March 1945) was a German Army officer. In World War II, Fromm was Commander in Chief of the Replacement Army (Ersatzheer), in charge of training and personnel replacement for combat divisions of the German Army, a position he occupied for most of the war. A recipient of the Knight's Cross of the Iron Cross, he was executed for failing to act against the plot of 20 July 1944 to assassinate Hitler.

Early life
Fromm was born in Charlottenburg. He served as a Prussian Army officer during World War I.

Head of the Reserve Army 
In 1939, Fromm became Chief of Army Equipment and commander of the Replacement Army.

When Operation Barbarossa stalled outside of Moscow in December 1941 and the Russian counter-attack started, Hitler took direct command of the Army and re-organized the armed forces' command structure. The Office of the Chief of Army Armament and the Reserve Army under Generaloberst Friedrich Fromm was created, subordinate to the commander in chief, army (head of the OKH, Hitler). Fromm had enough power at his disposal to control the German state because his position controlled army procurement and production and commanded all army troops inside Germany.

At the beginning of 1942, Fromm apparently recommended a defensive strategy for the entire year because of exhausted army stockpiles and the diversion of production, after the initial successes of Barbarossa in the summer of 1941.

20 July plot

In World War II, Fromm was Commander in Chief of the Reserve Army (Ersatzheer), in charge of training and personnel replacement for the German Army, a position he occupied for most of the war. Fromm was aware that some of his subordinates, most notably Claus von Stauffenberg, his chief of staff, were planning an assassination attempt against Adolf Hitler, but did not have any direct involvement in the conspiracy. When the attempt to proceed with a mutiny on 15 July 1944 failed, he refused to have any further part in it.

On 20 July, news broke that Hitler and several officers of the Supreme Command of the Armed Forces had become victims of an explosion in the German military's headquarters on the Eastern Front, the Wolfsschanze (Wolf's Lair), near Rastenburg, East Prussia (now Kętrzyn, Poland). Fromm quickly concluded that it was Stauffenberg and the plotters who were behind the explosion, and when he attempted to arrest them, Fromm was quickly overwhelmed and confined to a prison cell in the Bendlerblock, the Berlin headquarters of the Replacement Army, among other branches of the Wehrmacht, after he had refused to join the plotters in Operation Valkyrie (they had forged Fromm's signature to begin the operation).

After the coup failed, Fromm was found by men of the Ersatzheer and freed. Despite Hitler's direct orders to take the conspirators alive, Fromm held a summary court-martial of the active soldiers at his headquarters who had been identified or suspected of being part of the coup. As presiding official, Fromm condemned the officers to death and ordered their immediate execution by firing squad. As for retired Colonel-General Ludwig Beck, Fromm allowed his request to commit suicide, but since the suicide attempt failed, Fromm ordered him to be shot.

Arrest, trial and execution
After the Bendlerblock executions, Fromm went to Joseph Goebbels to claim credit for suppressing the coup, to which Goebbels only said, "You have been in a damn hurry to get your witnesses below ground." On the morning of 22 July 1944, Fromm and other members of the conspiracy were arrested. Since the court failed to prove a direct association with the 20 July plotters, he was instead charged and convicted for cowardice before the enemy. However, because he had executed the conspirators within reach, he was spared torture and execution by hanging with a thin rope, and sentenced to a military execution.

On 12 March 1945, Fromm was executed at the Brandenburg-Görden Prison by firing squad as part of the post-conspiracy purge. His last words before the firing squad were reported to be "I die, because it was ordered. I had always wanted only the best for Germany."

Awards
Iron Cross (1914)
2nd Class
1st Class
Wound Badge (1914)
in Black
Hanseatic Cross of Hamburg
Honour Cross of the World War 1914/1918
Anschluss Medal
Sudetenland Medal with Prague Castle Bar
Memel Medal
Clasp to the Iron Cross (1939)
2nd Class
1st Class
Knight's Cross of the Iron Cross on 6 July 1940 as General der Artillerie and chief of the Heeresrüstung (armament of the army) and commander in chief of the Ersatzheeres (replacement army)
Grand Cross of the Order of the White Rose of Finland (1941)
With Swords (1942)

In popular culture 
In the 2008 film Valkyrie he is portrayed by Tom Wilkinson.

See also

References

Citations

Bibliography

 
Kroener, Bernhard R. (2005). "Der starke Mann im Heimatkriegsgebiet". Generaloberst Friedrich Fromm. Eine Biographie. Paderborn: Schoeningh, Oler family (Alberta, Canada)

External links

 
 Lexikon der Wehrmacht

1888 births
1945 deaths
People from Charlottenburg
German Army generals of World War II
Colonel generals of the German Army (Wehrmacht)
People executed by Nazi Germany by firing squad
Executed members of the 20 July plot
Executed military leaders
German Army personnel of World War I
Recipients of the clasp to the Iron Cross, 1st class
Recipients of the Knight's Cross of the Iron Cross
People from Berlin executed by Nazi Germany
Prussian Army personnel
Reichswehr personnel
Military personnel from Berlin